Sparta Community Airport, also known as Hunter Field, is a civil, public use airport 2 miles north of Sparta, Illinois. The airport is publicly owned by the Sparta Community Airport Authority.

Facilities
The airport has two runways. Runway 18/36 is an asphalt runway measuring 4002 x 75 ft (1220 x 23 m). Runway 9/27 is a turf runway measuring 2958 x 110 ft (902 x 34 m).

The airport has a fixed-based operator (FBO) called Sparta Aero Services. It offers full- and self-service fueling, aircraft ground handling and parking, hangars, a passenger terminal, and a crew car. Flight training and aircraft rental are available for local pilots, as is aircraft maintenance.

Aircraft
For the 12-month period ending June 30, 2021, the airport has 93 aircraft operations per day, or about 34,000 per year. This is 75% general aviation, 18% air taxi, and 7% military. For that same time period, there are 32 aircraft based on the field: 29 single-engine and 2 multi-engine airplanes as well as 1 helicopter.

References 

 Airports in Illinois